Seema Rizvi was an Indian politician. She was a leader of the Bharatiya Janata Party from Uttar Pradesh. She was a member of Uttar Pradesh Legislative Council. Rizvi served as a Minister of State with Independent charge for Electronics and Information Technology in the ministry headed by Mayawati from May 3, 2002,	to August 29, 2003. She was a professor in Urdu department of Lucknow University.

On August 11, 2009, Rizvi suffered a brain haemorrhage and collapsed in her seat at Assembly and was declared dead.

References

1962 births
2009 deaths
State cabinet ministers of Uttar Pradesh
Members of the Uttar Pradesh Legislative Council
Bharatiya Janata Party politicians from Uttar Pradesh
Indian Shia Muslims
Politicians from Lucknow